Khoyto-Gol is a rural locality (an ulus) in Tunkinsky District, Republic of Buryatia, Russia. The population was 660 as of 2010. There are 29 streets.

Geography 
Khoyto-Gol is located 52 km west of Kyren (the district's administrative centre) by road. Turan is the nearest rural locality.

References 

Rural localities in Tunkinsky District